Lee Seok-hyun (born 13 June 1990) is a South Korean footballer who plays as midfielder for Jeonnam Dragons.

Career

Incheon United 
Incheon United signed him in December 2012. He made his debut goal against FC Seoul on 9 March 2013.

FC Seoul 
On 2 January 2015, He joined FC Seoul.

Pohang Steelers 
On 28 July 2018, He joined Pohang Steelers.

References

External links 

1990 births
Living people
Association football midfielders
South Korean footballers
Incheon United FC players
FC Seoul players
Pohang Steelers players
K League 1 players